Chen Tze-chung (born 24 June 1958) is a Taiwanese professional golfer who played on the PGA Tour, the Japan Golf Tour, the Asian Golf Circuit, the Asian Tour and the European Tour. In the U.S., he is often referred to as T.C. Chen.  His older brother, Chen Tze-ming, is also a professional golfer, who has won tournaments on the Japanese and Asian tours. 

In 1982, Chen became the first professional golfer from Taiwan to earn a PGA Tour card  and is the first Taiwanese golfer to win on the PGA Tour with a win at the 1987 Los Angeles Open. Pan Cheng-tsung, became the second Taiwanese golfer to win on the PGA Tour with a victory in the 2019 RBC Heritage tournament. Chen was the second golfer from Asia to win on the PGA tour following Isao Aoki of Japan, who won the 1983 Hawaiian Open. 

Representing his country as an amateur, Chen was a member of the 1976 Eisenhower Trophy team with his brother, and then won a bronze medal for Taiwan at the 1980 tournament, as Chen finished 2nd individually, behind Hal Sutton of the United States.  Chen finished 5th personally in the 1984 World Cup as a professional, leading Taiwan to a 2nd place finish behind Spain, and represented Taiwan in 1985 and 1994 at the Alfred Dunhill Cup tournament, a country-based team golf competition, playing alongside his brother.

Early life 
Chen was born in Linkou District, Taipei City, in northern Taiwan. He dropped out of school at 14 and went to work at a Bridgestone motorcycle factory. He quit the job after a year and took up golf, following in his older brother's footsteps. His grandfather farmed the land that would become the Linkou International Golf Club and his father worked as a greenskeeper at the club. Chen admired Taiwanese golfer Lu Liang-Huan as a youth, stating "when I was a little kid, after school I came to the golf course every day and watched. I didn't know anything about golf, only read about superstars like Nicklaus and Trevino, those who were in the papers every day. Mr. Lu had finished second at the British Open, so at the time he was very famous. I was thinking someday I will be just like him. That was part of the reason I started to play golf." The three-man Taiwanese team in the 1985 Dunhill Cup team championship featured Lu along with the Chen brothers.

Professional career   
Chen earned his PGA Tour card on his first attempt in 1982, finishing in a tie for 4th in the Q school, joined the tour in 1983, and played a total of 132 tournaments on the PGA Tour, making the cut in 78, with 13 top-ten finishes, 1 tour win, and over $633,000 in total earnings.  

At the 1985 U.S. Open, he scored the first double eagle in U.S. Open history and tied the record low scores for the championship at that time after 36 holes (134) and 54 holes (203). Leading with a two-stroke advantage heading into Sunday play, his fourth round included a quadruple-bogey eight that featured a chip shot that he hit twice in one swing, and became part of the history of disastrous shots in the final round of a major. Chen remained in contention for the title until the 18th, narrowly missing chipping in a bunker shot on the final hole, which would've forced a playoff with the eventual champion Andy North. As a result of the double-hit, it is sometimes referred to as a "TC Chen" and Chen is sometimes referred to as "Two Chips" Chen. In 2018, the USGA and The R&A, golf's governing bodies, announced a rule change for the double-hit, with the player counting it as one stroke and eliminating the penalty. Golf Digest said, "somewhere, TC Chen is smiling."

Chen finished second twice in his PGA career, at the 1983 Kemper Open, where he lost a five-man playoff to Fred Couples, and the above-mentioned 1985 U.S. Open. He played on the PGA Tour for 10 years, having his best year in 1987, when he finished 51st in earnings, 12th at the Masters, and won the 1987 Los Angeles Open with 275 (−9), defeating Ben Crenshaw in a playoff, for his only PGA Tour win. Chen sunk a 14-foot putt on the 18th hole to force the playoff, and then putted for par to beat Crenshaw on the first playoff hole. 

He returned primarily to play in Asia in 1990, playing extensively on the Japan Golf Tour, where he won six tournaments, and also appeared occasionally on the European Tour. He last played on the PGA Tour in 1997, returning to the U.S. to play in the Los Angeles Open as a former champion.

As a senior, Chen played the 2008 Senior British Open on the Champions Tour and returned to the United States for the 2012 U.S. Senior Open where he made the cut and finished 56th. In Asia, he won the 2015 Iwasaki Shiratsuyu Senior Tournament on the Japan PGA Senior Tour.

Personal life 

Chen and his brother Tze-ming have run and coached in the junior program at the Linkou Golf Club in Taipei City. He has three children (Jason, Jennifer, Jeffrey) and now lives in Walnut, California with his wife Sherry.

Professional wins (16)

PGA Tour wins (1)

PGA Tour playoff record (1–1)

Japan Golf Tour wins (6)

1Co-sanctioned by the Asia Golf Circuit

Japan Golf Tour playoff record (2–3)

Asia Golf Circuit wins (2)
1985 Maekyung Open, Dunlop International Open (also a Japan Golf Tour event)

Other wins (7)
 1984 King Grapes Classic (Japan)
 1989 Mercuries Taiwan Masters, Chang Hwa Open (Taipei), ROC PGA Championship (Taipei), Chang Kang Open (Taipei)
 1990 Japan Chunichi Crown Open
 1991 ROC PGA Championship (Taipei)

Japan PGA Senior Tour wins (1)
 2015 Iwasaki Shiratsuyu Senior Tournament

Results in major championships

CUT = missed the half-way cut
"T" = tied

Summary

 Most consecutive cuts made – 5 (1985 U.S. Open – 1987 Masters)
 Longest streak of top-10s – 1

Team appearances
Amateur
Eisenhower Trophy (representing Taiwan): 1976, 1980

Professional
Dunhill Cup (representing Taiwan): 1985, 1994
World Cup (representing Taiwan): 1984

See also 

 1982 PGA Tour Qualifying School graduates

References

External links
 
 
 

Taiwanese male golfers
Japan Golf Tour golfers
Asian Tour golfers
PGA Tour golfers
Sportspeople from Taipei
1958 births
Living people